'Living God' may refer to:

 Abrahamic God
 Jain God Simandhara